Below is a partial list of shows that were previously aired on ABS-CBN Sports and Action, a defunct free-to-air and internationally carried sports and action channel by ABS-CBN.

For the final aired sports and action shows and specials on ABS-CBN Sports and Action, see List of programs broadcast by ABS-CBN Sports and Action.

Previously aired

News
 News plus (2014)

News updates
 Fastbreak (2014–2017)

Sports
 FIVB World Grand Prix (2014)
 J. League Highlights (2014)
 UAAP Season 76 Football (2014)
 UAAP Season 76 Men's Volleyball (2014)
 UAAP Season 76 Women's Volleyball (2014)
 Ultimate Fighting Championship (2014-2015; now broadcast on Premier Sports)
 UEFA Champions League (2014)
 UEFA Europa League (2014)
 Universal Reality Combat Championship (2016-2018) 
 US Open (2016;  broadcast on Fox Sports from 2017 until 2021 and now broadcast on Premier Sports)
 World Wrestling Entertainment (discontinued; now broadcast on Disney+ Philippines and TAP Sports)
 WWE NXT (2014)
 WWE Raw (2014)
 WWE Tough Enough (2014)
 WWE Superstars (2014)

Sports magazine
 Euro Tour Highlights (2014)
 NBA Inside Stuff
 Road to Rio (2014)
 UEFA Europa League Magazine Show (2014)

Sports specials
Davis Cup Asia/Oceania Zone Group II 2nd Round: Philippines vs. Pakistan (April 11–13, 2014)
 2014 AFC Challenge Cup (May 20–31, 2014)
 2019 Southeast Asian Games (November 30, 2019–December 11, 2019)
Duelo sa Mexico: Merlito Sabillo vs. Francisco Rodriguez (March 23, 2014)
ICTSI: The Country Club Invitational (March 15, 2014)
Julio Cesar Chavez Jr. vs. Bryan Vera Fight (March 2, 2014)
Fight of Champions: Manny Pacquiao vs. Lucas Matthysse Fight (July 15, 2018)
Mikey Garcia vs. Juan Carlos Burgos Fight (January 26, 2014)
NBA Games (2014–2019; now broadcast on TV5, One Sports and NBA TV Philippines)
NBA All Star Weekend 2014 New Orleans
BBVA Rising Stars Challenge (February 15, 2014)
State Farm All Star Saturday Night (February 16, 2014)
NBA All Star Game (February 17, 2014)
 NBA Playoffs (2014–2019)
 NBA Finals (2014–2019)
Olivarez Cup: 2014 Philippine International Tennis Open (March 29–31, 2014)
Philippine Azkals Friendly Game vs. Malaysian Tigers II (March 1, 2014)
Philippine Azkals Friendly Game vs. Azerbaijan (March 4, 2014)
Philippine Azkals Friendly Game vs. Malaysian Tigers II (April 27, 2014)
Pinoy Pride 24: The Future Is Now: Genesis Servania vs. Alexander Munoz (March 2, 2014)
Ring of Gold: Shiming vs. Kokietgym; Marvin Sonsona vs. Akifumi Shimoda (February 23, 2014)
UAAP Men's Baseball Finals: Ateneo vs. La Salle (February 18, 21 & 24, 2014)
UAAP Men's Football Finals: FEU vs. UP (February 20 & 23, 2014)
UAAP Men's Volleyball Finals: Ateneo vs. NU (March 1 & 4, 2014)
UAAP Women's Volleyball Finals: La Salle vs. Ateneo (March 5, 8 & 12,  2014)
UAAP Women's Softball Finals: NU vs. Adamson (February 25, 2014)
UAAP Women's Football Finals: FEU vs. UST (February 20, 2014; February 23, 2014)
UAAP Men's Tennis Finals (February 17, 2014)
UAAP Season 80 Greats Documentary Special (September 9, 2017)
UAAP Season 81 Men's Basketball Finals: UP vs. Ateneo (December 1 & 5, 2018)
UFC 169: Barao vs. Faber II (February 2, 2014)
UFC 170: Rousey vs. Mcmann (February 23, 2014)
UFC 171: Hendricks vs. Lawler (March 16, 2014)
UFC Fight Night: Abu Dhabi (April 12, 2014)
UFC Fight Night: Macau (March 2, 2014)
UNDP Football Match against Poverty for the benefit of Typhoon Yolanda Survivors (March 9, 2014)
Vaseline Men Xterra Philippines Triathlon Championship 2014 (April 6, 2014)
Welterweight Supremacy: Manny Pacquiao vs. Keith Thurman Fight (July 21, 2019)
WWE Elimination Chamber (February 25, 2014)
WWE Royal Rumble (January 28, 2014)
World Series by Renault (April 13, 2014)

Election coverage
Halalan 2016: Ipanalo ang Pamilyang Pilipino (May 9−10, 2016)
Halalan 2019: Ipanalo: Boses ng Pilipino (March 24−May 13−14, 2019)

Specials
Araw ng Dabaw Special Coverage (March 15, 2014; only aired on ABS-CBN S+A 21 Davao)
Miss Cebu (only aired on ABS-CBN S+A 23 Cebu)
Pantawid ng Pag-ibig: At Home Together Concert (March 22, 2020) (together with ABS-CBN, ANC, Jeepney TV, DZMM Radyo Patrol 630, DZMM Teleradyo, Metro Channel, Asianovela Channel, MOR Philippines, iWant, and TFC)
The Football Warriors of Tacloban: UNDP Shortfilm (March 2014)

Reality
 Driven to Extremes (2014)
 Freedom Riders Asia (2014)
 GT Academy (2014)
 The Ultimate Fighter: Team Jones vs. Team Sonnen (2014)

Documentary
 Friday's Action Pack
 When Good Pets Gone Bad (2014)
 When Stunts Go Bad (2014)
 World's Deadliest Sea Creatures (2014)
 World's Deadliest Storms (2014)
 World's Scariest Police Shootouts (2014)
 World's Worst Drivers: Caught on Tape (2014)

Anime and Tokusatsu
 Little Battlers eXperience (2014)
 Metal Fight Beyblade (2014)
 Ultraman Mebius (2014)
 Power Rangers Samurai (2014)
 Nura Rise of The Yokai Clan (2014)
 Tai Chi Chasers (2014)
 Heroman (2014)
 Yu-Gi-Oh! Zexal (2014)
 Reborn (2014)

Informative
 Agribusiness: How It Works (2014)

Comedy
 Kaya Mo Bang!: The Fudgee Barr Adventures (2014)

Religious
 Family Rosary Crusade (2014–2018)
 Kasama Natin ang Diyos Holy Week Special (April 18, 2014)

Cartoon
 Avengers Assemble (2014)
 Bubble Guppies (seasons 1 and 2) (2014)
 Dora the Explorer (2014)
 Go, Diego Go! (2014)
 Marvel Knights (2014)
 Spider-Man Unlimited (2014)
 Supa Strikas (2014)
 Team Umizoomi (seasons 1 to 3) (2014)
 Thomas and Friends (2014)
 Spider-Man and His Amazing Friends (2014)
 Silver Surfer (2014)
 Voltron (2014)
 Voltron Force (2014)

Movie Blocks
 Action Movie Zone (2014−2017)
 Lunch Blockbusters (2014−2017)
 FPJ: Kampeon ng Aksyon (2014−2017)

See also
S+A
List of programs broadcast by ABS-CBN Sports and Action

Lists of television series by network
ABS-CBN Sports and Action original programming